"Lonely, Cryin', Only" is a song by rock band Therapy? and a single released on A&M Records on 18 May 1998. It is featured on the Semi-Detached album. This single reached number 32 in the UK Singles Chart.

The single was released on CD, CD digipak, and blue 7" vinyl.

Track listing

CD

CD digipak

7"

Personnel
Andy Cairns: vocals/guitar
Michael McKeegan: bass/backing vocals
Martin McCarrick: guitar/backing vocals
Graham Hopkins: drums/backing vocals
Chris Sheldon: producer (title track)
Matt Sime & Therapy?: producer (B-sides)

References

Songs about loneliness
1998 singles
Therapy? songs
Song recordings produced by Chris Sheldon
1998 songs
A&M Records singles
Songs written by Andy Cairns